Hélio Dias de Oliveira (born 19 December 1943) is a Brazilian former footballer who competed in the 1964 Summer Olympics.

References

1943 births
Living people
Association football goalkeepers
Brazilian footballers
Olympic footballers of Brazil
Footballers at the 1964 Summer Olympics
Botafogo de Futebol e Regatas players
Pan American Games medalists in football
Pan American Games gold medalists for Brazil
Footballers at the 1963 Pan American Games
Medalists at the 1963 Pan American Games